Liga de Fútbol de Tehuacán A.C. is a Mexican football club that plays in the Tercera División de México. The club is based in Tehuacán, Puebla.

History
The club was founded in 1945 as an amateur league that consisted of work factories, schools and natives of Tehuacan playing a league and cup tournament. In 1984, Mario Rivera, Mario LOpes, Jose Alameda, Jose Ronquillo and Rafael Lagos took over the club.

The club recently played in the Tercera División de México. The club is made up from the best players from the Liga Futbol de Tehuacan A.C..

Crest
The crest is a football with the city of Tehuacan crest in the middle, along with the club's name in the upper outer layer. At the bottom is the club's motto, Deporte Salud y Vida(Sport Health and Life).

See also
Football in Mexico

References

External links
Official page
Liga Tehuacan

Football clubs in Puebla
Association football clubs established in 1945
1945 establishments in Mexico